Pillar Rock is a pillar-like monolith in the Columbia River, near its mouth in Washington. Formerly rising 75–100 feet above the water, it was dynamited and diminished to serve as the site of a navigational marker and light. The Lewis and Clark Expedition camped twice near the rock, on November 7 and November 25, 1805.

The name "Pillar Rock" also refers to a small village on the river's north shore, opposite the rock. As recently as 1851, the village was home to a small group  of the Kathlamet band of Chinook Indians under the headship of a man named Tolillicum.

References

Landforms of Wahkiakum County, Washington
Populated places in Wahkiakum County, Washington